Corona Capital is an annual music festival held in Mexico City, taking place in the Autódromo Hermanos Rodríguez. It debuted in 2010 and is organized by Grupo CIE. It primarily features rock and alternative music.

The festival has managed to establish itself as one of the largest and most in-demand music events in Latin America, and its considered to be Mexico's equivalent to festivals such as Coachella and Lollapalooza having headliners such as Foo Fighters, Arctic Monkeys, The Stone Roses, Portishead and Pixies.

In 2018, the festival expanded to the state of Jalisco during springtime with a completely different lineup billed as Corona Capital Guadalajara.

Despite the festival's commercial and media success, it has also been the subject of much criticism and controversy after banning all local and Spanish-speaking performers in its lineup since 2013.

According to its organizers, the decision to focus only in English-speaking talent was made as a "solely commercial movement" being also organizers of other festivals such as Vive Latino and Electric Daisy Carnival where they can support their local performers, resulting in Corona Capital being the only music festival in the world that hosts only foreigner talent from outside the hosting country.

Editions

References

External links

 

Music festivals in Mexico
Music festivals established in 2010
Alternative rock festivals
Rock concerts